Peter Reichnwallner was a West German luger who competed in the early 1970s. He won the bronze medal in the men's doubles event at the 1972 FIL European Luge Championships in Königssee, West Germany.

References

List of European luge champions 

German male lugers
Possibly living people
Year of birth missing